Giuliano Vassalli (25 April 1915 – 21 October 2009) was an Italian politician, lecturer and lawyer.

Life
He was born in Perugia, son of Filippo Vassalli, a famous lecturer and lawyer. During World War II, Vassalli was imprisoned by Nazi forces in Rome and subjected to torture. Pope Pius XII intervened personally on his behalf and was able to have his life spared.

Political career
After 1945, Vassalli joined the Italian Socialist Party (PSI). From 1968 to 1972, he was a member of the Chamber of Deputies, and then from 1983 to 1987 a member of the Senate of the Republic for the PSI. In 1987, Giovanni Goria named him Italian Minister of Justice; he was confirmed along with Ciriaco De Mita and Giulio Andreotti. During this time, he approved a new proceeding criminal code.

President Francesco Cossiga appointed him to the Constitutional Court of Italy on 4 February 1991 and was swore in nine days after. He was vice-president of the court from 1996 to 1999 under Renato Granata, and president of the Constitutional Court of Italy from 11 November 1999 to 13 February 2000.

Retirement
Although in his later years Vassalli retired from public life, he was sometimes asked for his advice. In 2001, Prime Minister Silvio Berlusconi sought his advice over the European Arrest Warrant and Vassalli answered that it was a violation of the principles of natural justice.

References

1915 births
2009 deaths
People from Perugia
Members of the Senate of the Republic (Italy)
Italian Socialist Party politicians
Italian Ministers of Justice
Candidates for President of Italy
Presidents of the Constitutional Court of Italy
Members of the Chamber of Deputies (Italy)
20th-century Italian politicians